Chlorocalis  is a genus of praying mantids in the family Mantidae, now placed in the tribe Hierodulini.
Species can be found in the Indo-China region.

Species 
The Mantodea Species File lists:
 Chlorocalis maternaschulzei Stiewe, Vermeersch & Shcherbakov, 2019 Type locality: Nakhon Ratchasima Province, Thailand.
 Chlorocalis prasina Vermeersch, Shcherbakov & Stiewe, 2019 Type locality: Kon Tum Province, Vietnam.

References

External links 
 
 

Mantodea genera
Insects of Southeast Asia
Hierodulinae